Salerno is an ancient city and commune in Campania, southwestern Italy, and is the capital of the namesake province, being the second largest city in the region by number of inhabitants, after Naples. It is located on the Gulf of Salerno on the Tyrrhenian Sea. In recent history the city hosted Victor Emmanuel III, the King of Italy, who moved from Rome in 1943 after Italy negotiated a peace with the Allies in World War II, making Salerno the capital of the "Government of the South" (Regno del Sud) and therefore provisional government seat for six months. Some of the Allied landings during Operation Avalanche (the invasion of Italy) occurred near Salerno.

Human settlement at Salerno has a rich and vibrant past, dating back to pre-historic times. In the early Middle Ages it was an independent Lombard principality, the Principality of Salerno, which around the 11th century comprised most of Southern Italy. During this time, the Schola Medica Salernitana, the first medical school in the world, was founded. The Normans in 1077 made Salerno the capital of their rule in all continental southern Italy. In the 16th century, under the Sanseverino family, among the most powerful feudal lords in southern Italy, the city became a great centre of learning, culture and the arts, and the family hired several of the greatest intellectuals of the time. Later, in 1694, the city was struck by several catastrophic earthquakes and plagues. During a period of Spanish rule the city suffered a crisis which would last until the 18th century, but under Napoleon Salerno became part of the Parthenopean Republic. In the 19th century Salerno supported ideas of the Risorgimento and welcomed Garibaldi in 1861.

The city is divided into three distinct zones: the medieval sector, the 19th century sector and the more densely populated post-war area, with its several apartment blocks.

A patron saint of Salerno is Saint Matthew, the Apostle, whose relics are kept here at the crypt of Salerno Cathedral.

History

Prehistory and antiquity
The area of what is now Salerno has been continuously settled since pre-historical times, as the discoveries of Neolithic mummy remains documents. Inhabited by Oscan-speaking populations, the region was colonized by the Etruscans, who founded the city of Irnthi in the 6th century BC, across the Irno river, in what is today city quarter of Fratte, as a part of their Dodecapolis political model they essentially replicated in Campania. This settlement represented an important base for Etruscan trade with the nearby Greek colonies of Posidonia and Elea. It was occupied by the Samnites around the 5th century BC as a consequence of the Battle of Cumae (474 BC) as part of the Syracusan sphere of influence.

With the Roman advance in Campania, Irna began to lose its importance, being supplanted by the new Roman colony (197 BC) of Salernum, developing around an initial castrum. The new city, which gradually lost its military function in favour of its role as a trade centre, was connected to Rome by the Via Popilia, which ran towards Lucania and Reggio Calabria.

Archaeological remains, although fragmentary, suggest the idea of a flourishing and lively city. Under the Emperor Diocletian, in the late 3rd century AD, Salernum became the administrative centre of the "Lucania and Bruttii" province.

In the following century, during the Gothic Wars, the Goths were defeated by the Byzantines, and the Salerno briefly returned to the control of Constantinople (from 553 to 568), before the Lombards invaded almost the whole peninsula. Like many coastal cities of southern Italy (Gaeta, Sorrento, Amalfi), Salerno initially remained untouched by the newcomers, falling only in 646. It subsequently became part of the Duchy of Benevento.

Middle Ages to early modern age

Under the Lombard dukes Salerno enjoyed the most splendid period of its history.

In 774 Arechis II of Benevento transferred the seat of the Duchy of Benevento to Salerno, in order to elude Charlemagne's offensive and to secure for himself the control of a strategic area, the centre of coastal and internal communications in Campania.

With Arechis II, Salerno became a centre of studies with its famous Medical School. The Lombard prince ordered the city to be fortified; the Castle on the Bonadies mountain had already been built with walls and towers. In 839 Salerno declared independence from Benevento, becoming the capital of a flourishing principality stretching out to Capua, northern Calabria and Apulia up to Taranto. In 871–872, the Aghlabids besieged Salerno, but the city was relieved by Louis II of Italy.

Around the year 1000 prince Guaimar IV annexed Amalfi, Sorrento, Gaeta and the whole duchy of Apulia and Calabria, starting to conceive a future unification of the whole southern Italy under Salerno's arms. The coins minted in the city circulated all over the Mediterranean, with the Opulenta Salernum wording to certify its richness.

However, the stability of the Principate was continually shaken by the Saracen attacks and, most of all, by internal struggles. In 1056, one of the numerous plots led to the fall of Guaimar. His weaker son Gisulf II succeeded him, but the decline of the principality had begun. In 1077 Salerno reached its zenith but soon lost all its territory to the Normans.

On 13 December 1076, the Norman conqueror Robert Guiscard, who had married Guaimar IV's daughter Sikelgaita, besieged Salerno and defeated his brother-in-law Gisulf. In this period the royal palace of Castel Terracena and the cathedral were built, and science was boosted as the Schola Medica Salernitana, considered the most ancient medical institution of the European West, reached its maximum splendour. At this time in the late 11th century, the city was home to 50,000 people.

In 1100, Salerno was made the capital of Norman southern Italy, after Melfi.

Salerno was the most important city of the Normans for half a century, but with the Norman conquest of southern Italy, the city of Palermo started to substitute Salerno as the most important city for the Normans. Indeed, Salerno played a little part in the fall of the County of Sicily, after the Emperor Henry VI's invasion on behalf of his wife, Constance, the heiress to the kingdom, in 1191, Salerno surrendered and promised loyalty on the mere news of an incoming army.

This so disgusted the archbishop, Nicolò d'Aiello (from Naples), that he abandoned the city and fled to Naples, which held out in a siege. In 1194, the situation reversed itself: Naples capitulated, along with most other cities of the Mezzogiorno, and only Salerno resisted. It was sacked and pillaged, much reducing its importance and prosperity.

Henry had his reasons, though. He had entrusted Constance to some important Salerno citizens (advised & "ruled" by the archbishop d'Aiello) and after his retreat from invasion in 1191 they had received letters about the events from Nicolò D'Aiello and so betrayed Henry, attacked Constance at Castel Terracena and handed her over to King Tancred of Sicily, making the Empress captive for nearly one year. The combined treachery and stubbornness of D'Aiello and his followers cost Salerno much after the Hohenstaufen conquest: Henry's son, Frederick II, moreover, issued a series of edicts that reduced Salerno's role in favour of Naples (in particular, the foundation of the University of Naples in that city).

From the 14th century onwards, most of the Salerno province became the territory of the Princes of Sanseverino, powerful feudal lords who acted as real owners of the region. They accumulated enormous political and administrative power and attracted artists and men of letters in their own princely palace. In the 15th century, the city was the scene of battles between the Angevin and the Aragonese royal houses with whom the local lords took sides alternatingly.

In the first decades of the 16th century, the last descendant of the Sanseverino princes, Ferdinando Sanseverino, was in conflict with the viceroy of the king of Spain, mainly because of his opposition to the Inquisition, causing the ruin of the whole family and the beginning of a long period of decadence for the city.

A slow renewal of the city occurred in the 18th century with the end of the Spanish dominion and the construction of many refined houses and churches characterising the main streets of the historical centre. In 1799 Salerno was incorporated into the Parthenopean Republic. During the Napoleonic era, first Joseph Bonaparte and then Joachim Murat ascended the Neapolitan throne. The latter decreed the closing of the Schola Medica Salernitana, which had been declining for decades to the level of a theoretical school. In the same period, even the religious orders were suppressed and numerous ecclesiastical properties were confiscated.

The city expanded beyond the ancient walls and sea connections were potentiated as they represented an important road network that crossed the town connecting the eastern plain with the area leading to Vietri and Naples.

Late modern and contemporary
Salerno was an active center of Carbonari activities supporting the unification of Italy in the 19th century. The majority of the population of Salerno supported ideas of the Risorgimento, and in 1861 many of them joined Garibaldi in his struggle for unification.

After the unification of Italy, a slow urban development continued, many suburban areas were enlarged and large public and private buildings were created. The city went on developing until World War II. Its population rose from 20,000 people around 1861s unification to 80,000 in the early 20th century.

During the 19th century, foreign industries started settling in Salerno: in 1830 the first textile mill was established by the Swiss entrepreneur Züblin Vonwiller, followed by Schlaepfer-Wenner's textile mills and dye factories; the Wenner family settled permanently in Salerno. In 1877 the city was the site of as many as 21 textile mills employing around ten thousand workers; in comparison with the four thousand employed in Turin's textile industry, Salerno was sometimes referred to as the "Manchester of the two Sicilies".

In September 1943, during World War II, Salerno was the scene of Operation Avalanche, the invasion of Italy launched by the Allies of World War II, and suffered a great deal of damage. Henry Wellesley, 6th Duke of Wellington, who was killed in action during the fighting, is buried in Salerno War Cemetery. From 12 February to 17 July 1944, it hosted the Government of Marshal Pietro Badoglio. In those months Salerno was the provisional government seat of the Kingdom of Italy, and the King Vittorio Emanuele III lived in a mansion in its outskirts.

After the war the population of the city doubled in a few years, going from 80,000 in 1946 to nearly 160,000 in 1976.

Geography
The city is situated at the northwestern end of the plain of the Sele River, at the exact beginning of the Amalfi coast. The small river Irno crosses through the central section of Salerno. The highest point is "Monte Stella" with its .

Climate
The strong wind that comes from the mountains toward the Gulf of Salerno makes the city very windy (mainly in winter). However, this gives Salerno the advantage of being one of the sunniest towns in Italy.

Demographics
In 2007, there were 140,580 people residing in Salerno, located in the province of Salerno, Campania, of whom 46.7% were male and 53.3% were female. Minors (children ages 18 and younger) totalled 19.61 per cent of the population compared to pensioners who number 21.86 per cent. This compares with the Italian average of 18.06 per cent (minors) and 19.94 per cent (pensioners). The average age of Salerno residents is 42 compared to the Italian average of 42. In the five years between 2002 and 2007, the population of Salerno grew by 2.02 per cent, while Italy as a whole grew by 3.85 per cent. The current birth rate of Salerno is 7.77 births per 1,000 inhabitants compared to the Italian average of 9.45 births.

As of 31 December 2010, there were 4,355 foreigners in Salerno. The largest immigrant group came from other European countries (mainly Ukraine and Romania). The population is overwhelmingly Roman Catholic.

Economy
The economy of Salerno is mainly based on services and tourism, as most of the city's manufacturing base did not survive the economic crisis of the 1970s. The remaining ones are connected to pottery and food production and treatment.

The Port of Salerno is one of the most active of the Tyrrhenian Sea. It handles about 10 million tons of cargo per year, 60% of which is made up by containers.

Transport
Salerno is connected to the A2, Autostrada A3 and Autostrada A30 motorways.

Salerno station is the main railway station of the city. It is connected to the high-speed railway network via the Milan-Salerno corridor.  The main bus stop of Salerno is also at the train station, with both CSTP buses and SITA buses.

A metro light rail line connects the train station with Stadio Arechi, with seven intermediate stops.

A new Maritime Terminal Station, designed by Zaha Hadid Architects, was completed in 2016 and was opened for the 2017 cruise season. Salerno features three marinas: Manfredi Pier, Masuccio Salernitano, and Marina di Arechi (opened in 2015).

Salerno airport is located in the neighboring towns of Pontecagnano Faiano and Bellizzi.

Education
Salerno hosted the oldest medical school in the world, the Schola Medica Salernitana, the most important source of medical knowledge in Europe in the early Middle Ages. It was closed in 1811 by Joachim Murat.

In 1944 king Vittorio Emanuele III established Istituto Universitario di Magistero "Giovanni Cuomo". In 1968 the university became state-controlled. Today University of Salerno is located in the neighboring town of Fisciano and has about 34,000 students and ten faculties: Arts and Philosophy, Economics, Education, Engineering, Foreign language and literature, Law, Mathematics, Physics and Natural Sciences, Medicine, Pharmacy and Political Science.

Sport

The city's main football team is U.S. Salernitana 1919, that plays in Serie A (the first highest football division in Italy). Their home stadium is Stadio Arechi, opened in 1990 and with a capacity of 37,245.

The most successful team in the city is the women's handball team PDO Handball Team Salerno, with its four national titles, four national cups and two national supercups; other noteworthy teams are Arechi in rugby and Rari Nantes Salerno in water polo.

The city has also a tradition in motorsport.

Attractions

Salerno is located at the geographical center of a triangle nicknamed Tourist Triangle of the 3 P's (namely a triangle with the corners in Pompei, Paestum and Positano). This peculiarity gives Salerno special tourist characteristics that are increased by the many local points of tourist interest like the Lungomare Trieste (Trieste Seafront Promenade), the Castello di Arechi (Arechis' Castle), the Duomo (cathedral) and the Museo Didattico della Scuola Medica Salernitana (Educational Museum of the Salernitan Medical School).

Twin towns – sister cities
Salerno is twinned with:

See also
 List of Princes of Salerno
 Principality of Salerno
 Schola Medica Salernitana
 Salerno Ivories
 Salerno railway station
 University of Salerno
 U.S. Salernitana 1919
 Operation Avalanche
 Salerno Cathedral

References

Bibliography

 Bonfanti, Giuseppe. Dalla Svolta di Salerno al 18 aprile 1948. Editrice La Scuola. Brescia 1979.
 Crisci, Generoso. Salerno sacra:ricerca storica. Edizioni della Curia arcivescovile. Salerno 1962.
 D'Episcopo, Francesco. Salerno. Sulla scia di Alfonso Gatto. Masuccio e l'Ottocento salernitano. Editrice Il Sapere. Ancona 2004.
 De Renzi, Salvatore. Storia documentata della Scuola Medica di Salerno. Tipografie Gaetano Nobile. Naples, 1857.
 Di Martino, Maristella. Le Ricette di Salerno. La cultura gastronomica della città. Editore Il Raggio di Luna. Salerno 2006.
 Errico, Ernesto. Cinquant'anni fa a Salerno. Ripostes Editore. Salerno 2004.
 Felici, Maria. Palazzi nobiliari a Salerno. Edizioni La Veglia. Salerno 1996.
 Fonzo, Erminio, Partiti ed elezioni in provincia di Salerno nella crisi dello Stato liberale (1919–1923) in Rassegna storica lucana, nn. 49–50, 2011, pp. 43–113.
 Fonzo, Erminio, Il fascismo conformista. Le origini del regime nella provincia di Salerno (1920–1926), Edizioni del Paguro, Mercato San Severino (SA), 2011.
 Giordano, Gaetano. Il Profeta della Grande Salerno. Cento anni di storia meridionale nei ricordi di Alfonso Menna. Avagliano Editore. Salerno 1999.
 Iannizzaro, Vincenzo. Salerno. La Cinta Muraria dai Romani agli Spagnoli. Editore Elea Press. Salerno 1999.
 Iovino, Giorgia. Riqualificazione urbana e sviluppo locale a Salerno. Attori, strumenti e risorse di una città in trasformazione. Edizioni Scientifiche Italiane. Naples, 2002.
 Mazzetti, Massimo. Salerno Capitale d'Italia. Edizioni del Paguro. Salerno 2000.
 Musi, Aurelio. Salerno moderna. Editore Avagliano. Salerno 1999.
 Ferraiolo Marco Storia di un anno di anni fa – Racconti di vita salernitana degli anni 60–70 . Edizioni Ripostes . Salerno 2005
 Roma, Adelia. I giardini di Salerno. Editore Elea Press. Salerno 1997.
 Seton-Watson, Christopher. Italy from Liberalism to Fascism, 1870–1925. John Murray Publishers. London, 1967.

External links

 Photo of the "Cripta" of the Salerno Cathedral, where is the tomb of the Apostle Matthew
 Information about the city of Salerno (in Italian)
 
 

 
Coastal towns in Campania
Cities founded by Rome